Françoise Dürr and Virginia Wade were the defending champions, but lost in the final to Kerry Reid and Wendy Turnbull. The score was 6–3, 7–5.

Seeds

Draw

Draw

References
 Official results archive (ITF)
 Official results archive (WTA)

Advanta Championships of Philadelphia
1978 WTA Tour